

Vertebrates

Newly named vertebrates

References

1860s in paleontology
Paleontology
Paleontology 4
Paleontology, 1864 In